Princeton Junction is an unincorporated community and census-designated place (CDP) located within West Windsor Township, in Mercer County, New Jersey, United States. As of the 2010 United States Census, the CDP's population was 2,465.

History 

Following the mid-1860s relocation of the Camden & Amboy rail line from next to the Delaware & Raritan Canal to the present location of the Northeast Corridor, and the subsequent construction of a train station south of the intersection of Washington Road and the new rail line, a community called "Princeton Junction" developed. This community originally featured several farmhouses, a hotel, a general store, a feed mill, and several other businesses centered around the intersection of Station Drive & Washington Road, profiting off of access to other cities provided by the rail line.

The construction of the neighborhood of Berrien City (focused around Scott Avenue, Alexander Road, and Berrien Avenue) represented West Windsor's first planned development. Following the reconstruction of the Washington Road railroad bridge in 1939, the business center of the community shifted to the intersection of Washington Road and Cranbury Road, where a lumber yard, service station, liquor store, strip mall, several gas stations, and several more businesses operated for decades.

Following World War II, the Princeton Junction population grew with the construction of residential developments such as Sherbrooke Estates, Windsor Chase, and Wellington Estates.

Princeton Junction is currently the proposed site of a "Transit Village" to be built northwest of the train station.

In October 2019, the Historical Society of West Windsor published an online museum exploring the history of West Windsor - including that of Princeton Junction.

Geography

According to the United States Census Bureau, the CDP had a total area of 1.853 square miles (4.801 km2), including 1.826 square miles (4.730 km2) of land and 0.027 square miles (0.071 km2) of water (1.48%).

Princeton Junction's name comes from the train station of the same name, now on the Amtrak and New Jersey Transit Northeast Corridor. The station is the junction between this main line and a spur served by the "Dinky" train, run by New Jersey Transit, to Princeton itself.

Demographics

Census 2010

Census 2000
As of the 2000 United States Census there were 2,382 people, 842 households, and 681 families living in the CDP. The population density was 491.8/km2 (1,276.9/mi2). There were 858 housing units at an average density of 177.2/km2 (460.0/mi2). The racial makeup of the CDP was 86.99% White, 2.02% African American, 0.13% Native American, 8.86% Asian, 0.76% from other races, and 1.26% from two or more races. Hispanic or Latino of any race were 3.06% of the population.

There were 842 households, out of which 41.7% had children under the age of 18 living with them, 71.0% were married couples living together, 7.4% had a female householder with no husband present, and 19.1% were non-families. 15.6% of all households were made up of individuals, and 5.8% had someone living alone who was 65 years of age or older. The average household size was 2.82 and the average family size was 3.14.

In the CDP the population was spread out, with 28.3% under the age of 18, 4.0% from 18 to 24, 27.8% from 25 to 44, 28.9% from 45 to 64, and 11.0% who were 65 years of age or older. The median age was 40 years. For every 100 females, there were 99.2 males. For every 100 females age 18 and over, there were 98.4 males.

The median income for a household in the CDP was $116,668, and the median income for a family was $127,617. Males had a median income of $100,000 versus $58,750 for females. The per capita income for the CDP was $44,113. None of the families and 1.5% of the population were living below the poverty line, including no under eighteens and 5.3% of those over 64.

Business and industry
At the turn of the century two of Princeton Junction's landmark retailers closed. One was Lick-It ice cream, a tiny kiosk-like yellow building that served ice cream to walk-in and drive-through customers, always including a trademark nonpareil in the ice cream. Also, the family-owned Lucar Hardware store shut down due to competition with superstores like Home Depot and Lowe's Hardware.  Competition was not the only factor, however.  The owners sought to retire, and the land had become more valuable.  The site is now occupied by PNC Bank.

In 2008-2009, Princeton Junction saw the further closure of a number of businesses that had been longtime fixtures.  Among the most significant is the closure of an Acme Supermarket, which had been an anchor tenant in the Windsor Plaza Shopping Center for 50 years.  Other closures (of Chicken Holiday fast food shop, a paint store and an Asian restaurant) were prompted to make way for the construction of a new Rite Aid store.

Some residents blame the 'deterioration' of the central Princeton Junction area on a lack of political consensus.

Notable people

People who were born in, residents of, or otherwise closely associated with Princeton Junction include:
 Kevin Barry (born 1978), baseball player.
 Douglas Forrester (born 1953), former gubernatorial candidate.
 Ethan Hawke (born 1970), actor.
 Matt Lalli (born 1986), professional lacrosse player for the Boston Cannons of Major League Lacrosse.
 Ben H. Love (1930–2010), eighth Chief Scout Executive of the Boy Scouts of America serving from 1985 to 1993.
 James Murphy (born 1970), singer, songwriter, DJ, electronic musician (as LCD Soundsystem).
 John Forbes Nash Jr. (1928–2015), mathematician.
 Bryan Singer (born 1965), film director, writer and producer.

Note
 Christopher McQuarrie (born 1968), screenwriter, was born either in Princeton Junction, where he was raised, or in nearby Princeton. Different sources — and in the case of All Movie Guide, the same source — give both places. Note that Princeton Junction has no hospital.

Nearby historic communities
 Blawenburg in Montgomery Township
 Clarksburg in Millstone Township
 Dayton in South Brunswick
 Harlingen in Montgomery Township
 Kingston in Franklin Township and South Brunswick
 Lawrenceville in Lawrence Township (Mercer County)
 Dutch Neck in West Windsor Township
 The Monmouth Battlefield Historic District in Freehold Township and Manalapan Township
 Monmouth Junction in South Brunswick
 Perrineville in Millstone Township
 The Princeton Battlefield Historic District in Princeton
 Plainsboro Center in Plainsboro Township
 Skillman in Montgomery Township
 Tennent in Manalapan Township
 West Freehold in Freehold Township

References

Census-designated places in Mercer County, New Jersey
West Windsor, New Jersey